Mirko Alessandrini (born 27 January 1989), known online as CiccioGamer89 or Ciccio, is one of the most popular and followed Italian YouTubers.
Joining YouTube on 8 July 2012, he has over three million subscribers and he is the 27th Italian YouTuber by the number of subscribers.

In his channel he mainly brings gameplay videos, but he also has a long series of cooking videos called "In cucina con Ciccio"and videos dedicated to his weight loss journey

Early life 
Born in Rome, Italy, in a poor family, when it was young he worked as a porter and baker.

Internet career

Beginning (2012-2015) 

Alessandrini originally registered a YouTube account in the early 2010s but, after reaching 1000 subscribers, YouTube decides to close his channel. On 8 July 2012 he decides to join YouTube agains under the nickname CiccioGamer89.

In his early years as a YouTube creator, Alessandrini focused on video game commentaries and let's play about Minecraft and Slenderman,  without made followers see his face. After a month, he decide to be seen in the face in a video, revealing the reason that prompted him to choose the nickname with which he became famous.
On 8 September 2012, he made his first vlog.  During this first years, he made his popularity with the two "trademarks" of his channel: the Hermit crab which acts as both the logo and mascot of the channel and his characteristic greeting at the beginning of each video, "Hakuna Matata, ragazzi!"  (in Swahili "Without thoughts").

In a short time, Alessandrini becomes a point of reference for the Italian YouTube community, with his videos about FIFA, MotoGP 15, Clash Royale and his format In Cucina con Ciccio. The format consist in advertising cooking videos. In February 2014 he reached 100.000 subscribers on YouTube and after 10 month he reached 500.000 subscribers.

Golden Button and "Nutellagate" (2016) 
On 2 July 2016 he received YouTube Golden Button for 1,000,000 subscribers.
On 1 October 2016, while he was signing autographs at Romics, an eighteen year old hit Alessandrini in the eye with a Nutella croissant and fled into the crowd: after about half an hour he returned managing to hit him with another croissant to the second time. On the second time, however, the YouTuber's guards managed to capture him and brought him in front of Alessandrini. The boy began to cry in front of him, and so Alessandrini decided not to file a complaint with him. Two days later Alessandrini uploaded a video with his reactions, where he expressed all his disappointment towards those who use YouTube to incite gestures of that kind and create hatred towards him.
The event was called "Nutellagate" by the web.

On October 5, the attacker, who owns the Zedrik HD channel, uploaded a video in which he claimed responsibility for the act, calling it "a joke";  he also said he had spoken to Alessandrini to apologize. The fact was later confirmed by a video uploaded to the latter's channel.

Sleeve Gastrectomy, first books and Twitch (2017-2021) 

Suffering from obesity, in 2017 Alessandrini underwent a bariatric surgery operation together with his brother Simone, through the sleeve gastrectomy procedure. In February 2017 he published an autobiographical book Io, me e me stesso". In 2017 he was als nominated in the top 3 in the Gameplay category of the Web Star Awards.

In the same year he start doing videos about Fortnite Battle Royale and in 2018 he published his second book CiccioGamer89 Presenta Fortnite. Trucchi e Segreti.

In November 2018, Alessandrini joined the streaming platform Twitch. However, his experience on the platform only lasts a year.

On 2019, two years later the first operation, they started another operation. In the same year he pubblished his second book about Fortnite Battle Royale and eSport and in 2020 he published his first cooking book.

In March 2020, during COVID–19 pandemic he mades a fundraiser during a livestream, raising €2300 donated to the Spallanzani Hospital in Rome. In the next months, during another livestream in collaboration with Tom's Hardware and the Italian YouTubers Favij and Anima, Alessandrini raised other €17.209.

Legal issues (2022-) 
On early November, Alessandrini announced a collaboration with Durex for the creation of limited edition condoms, called "Durex Let's go".

On 19 November 2022 Alessandrini was reported by the Guardia di Finanza for tax evasion for €400.000, he would not have declared income for 1 million euros. According to the reconstructions, Alessandrini would have failed to declare to the tax authorities more than one million euros in compensation in the last five years.  With these figures, having exceeded the minimum thresholds of punishment established by current legislation, once the financiers of the Provincial Command of Rome discovered the omission, the complaint was immediately triggered.

During the investigations, the military reconstructed in detail the volume of the entrepreneur's and the company's turnover thanks to an analysis of the partnership contracts stipulated with the multimedia giant Google Ireland and with some sponsorship agencies.

Alessandrini gave a first update on the matter via his Instagram profile, where he explained that he was not a tax evader and that his lawyers were already working on the case.

In January 2023 he received further criticism for his political point of view expressed during a live broadcast, praising a one-party state.

Personal life 
For six years he was engaged with Patrycja Izabela Leszczyszyn. From 2019 he is engaged with Veronica (known on internet as BigLove), an English teacher.

Gameography

References

Citations

Primary video, playlist, and post sources 
In the text these references are preceded by a double dagger (‡):

External links 

 Official channel

Living people
Italian YouTubers
1989 births